Inder Singh Kudrat is an Indian jeweller  and Master Craftsman who specialised in kundan meenakari. An artisan of Jaipur he was also known as  Swarnkar, or Sunar.

Early life and education
He received training by his father under GURU SHISHYA PARAMPARA, India have long tradition of Guru-shishya tradition, where skills is passed on father to son or by other relatives belonging to the same family or the same community, training the child while grooming, as family tradition. Kudrat singh later went to go study at Rajasthan School of Art and Crafts, Jaipur under the new British education system at Jaipur. He has won numerous awards, both national as well as international awards. In 2009 he was one of the awardees for the Indian National Award for Handicrafts.

Family origin

His family has origin as Sikh family of Meenakari craft belonging caste of Mair rajput.

Family history

His forefather was the founder of Meenakari craft at Jaipur also his forefather was given the royal patronage by the Kacchwaha King of Amber, and  Dhundhar Man Singh I, the rulers of Amber – Jaipur were not only brave and courageous but also were very efficient administrators. As administrators, they served very sincerely under different Mughal emperors and were duly acknowledged and rewarded.

Forefathers of Kudrat Singh

During 16th century his forefather was brought to Jaipore city which is now known as Jaipur city as capital of Rajasthan State, by the Kacchwaha King of Amber and Dhundhar Raja Man Singh I.

Kacchwaha King were even deputed as “Subedars” in different parts of North-West frontier and helped the emperors in running the administration
smoothly. during this time kudrat Singh forefather brought to Jaipore and Amber which is now known as Jaipur city as capital of Rajasthan State, from somewhere near to Lahore city situated in west Punjab,.

References

 The Times of India: खानदानी हुनर का दिखा रहे रंग
 Awards of National, Shilp Guru, Sant Kabir Awardees 2012

Living people
1950 births
Indian jewellers